The Dutch National Track Championships – Women's madison is the Dutch national championship madison event held annually at the Dutch National Track Championships. The event was first introduced for women in 2009.

Medalists

Results from cyclebase.nl

Multiple champions
3 times champion: Kirsten Wild and Amy Pieters, 2 times champion Roxane Knetemann, Kelly Markus

References

 
Dutch National track cycling championships
Women's madison